Le Combat Continue is the second studio album by French Hip Hop group, Idéal J. The album is considered a classic in French hip hop music. The lead single "Hardcore" caused a huge controversy in France.

The album, reached #21 of SNEP, the official French Albums Chart in October 1998.

The single "Hardcore" from the album appeared for ten weeks in the SNEP French Singles Chart with the peak position reached at #67.

Track listing
"Le combat continue 2"
"Introduction"
"Message" (feat. Leila)
"Pour une poignée de dollars..."
"Blast Masta Killa"
"Un nuage de fumée"
"Evitez" (feat. Daddy Mory)
"R.A.S. 1" (feat. Different Teep)
"Sur violents breakbeats"
"Hardcore"
"J'ai mal au cœur"
"L'amour" (feat. Rohff and Demon One)
"Ideal J" (feat. Hasheem & Zahariya) / "Operation coup 2 pompe"
"Showbizness 98" (feat. AP, Karlito, Dry and OGB)
"Si je rappe ici"

Samples
Le combat continue
 "The Music Band" by War
Introduction
 "Darkest Light" by Lafayette Afro Rock Band
 "Blow Your Head" by The J.B.'s
Message
 "Kismet" by Amon Düül 2
Pour une poignée de dollars...
 "Truc de fou" by 113 and Doudou Masta
Un nuage de fumée
 "Living Inside Your Love" by Earl Klugh
Evitez
 "Les Deux Pigeons" by Charles Aznavour
R.A.S. 1
 "Big Sur Suite" by Johnny Hammond
Sur violents breakbeats
 "Harmonique" by John Coltrane
Hardcore
 "Como Fué" by Paquito D'Rivera
J'ai mal au cœur
 "Manha de Carnaval" by Stan Getz et Astrud Gilberto
L'amour
 "Looking In" by Mariah Carey
Idéal J
 "I Wanna Do Something Freaky For You" by Leon Haywood
 "Ain't Nothin But a G Thang" by Dr. Dre and Snoop Dogg
Si je rappe ici
 "Summertime / The Ghetto" by Johnny Hammond

References

Idéal J albums
1998 albums